August W. Lueders (August 24, 1853 - December 18, 1929) was an author. He served as the chairman of the Board of Election Commissioners in Chicago, Illinois. He was a delegate to the 1916 Democratic National Convention.

Biography
He was born on August 24, 1853 in Armstedt, Germany. His parents were Hartwig Lueders of Armstedt and Margaret Christine Seligmann of Ascheberg, Schleswig-Holstein.

His family left Hamburg, Germany on July 22, 1868 on the steamer Holstein. They arrived in the United States on August 3, 1868 at 4:00 am in New York City. The next day they left for Chicago, Illinois on an immigrant train and arrived on Saturday, August 8, 1868 at 10:00 am.

In 1874, he became a policeman in Chicago, Illinois. He married Lena Freese	on September 12, 1879 in Chicago. They had a son, Dr. August Henry Lueders, who was the commissioner of the Chicago Department of Public Health.  He served as a member of the Board of Election Commissioners in Chicago, Illinois from 1914 to 1920.

He attended the 1916 Democratic National Convention in St. Louis.

He published his autobiography in 1929, Sixty Years in Chicago.

He died on December 18, 1929 in Hinsdale, Illinois.

References

External links
August Lueders at WorldCat
Sixty Years in Chicago at Internet Archive

German emigrants to the United States
People from Chicago
1853 births
1929 deaths